The 1993 Taça de Portugal Final was the final match of the 1992–93 Taça de Portugal, the 53rd season of the Taça de Portugal, the premier Portuguese football cup competition organized by the Portuguese Football Federation (FPF). The match was played on 10 June 1993 at the Estádio Nacional in Oeiras, and opposed two Primeira Liga sides: Benfica and Boavista. Benfica defeated Boavista 5–2 to claim the Taça de Portugal for a twenty-second time in their history.

In Portugal, the final was televised live on RTP. As a result of Benfica winning the Taça de Portugal, they qualified for the 1993 Supertaça Cândido de Oliveira where they took on 1992–93 Primeira Divisão winners Porto.

Match

Details

References

1993
1992–93 in Portuguese football
S.L. Benfica matches
Boavista F.C. matches